William Bowrey (born 25 December 1943) is a former Australian tennis player.

Bowrey was born in Sydney, New South Wales, Australia and is best remembered as the last amateur to win the Australian Championships in 1968 before the tournament opened itself to professional tennis players in 1969.

At the age of 16 Bowrey was a member of the schoolboys' NSW state PSAAA tennis team. In the process of qualifying he overcame promising Newcastle junior Ross Flanagan who had match point against Bowrey. Bowrey held on to win and Ross Flanagan decided to pursue a less spectacular career as a Physics and Sports Biomechanics Lecturer at The University of Newcastle.

Biography
Bowrey reached the quarters of the Australian (international amateur) Championships in 1965 (losing to John Newcombe), 1966 (losing to Roy Emerson) and 1967 (losing to Emerson) and the US Open quarters in 1966 (losing to Manuel Santana). At the 1967 US Open doubles, Bowrey and partner Owen Davidson lost the final to Newcombe and Roche in four sets. At the end of 1967, John Newcombe, Roy Emerson and Tony Roche had all signed professional contracts, which left the amateur game devoid of talent. A poor quality field lined up for the 1968 Australian championships, which were held at Melbourne's historic Kooyong Lawn Tennis Club. Bowrey was the top seed. In the final Bowrey met the Spaniard Juan Gisbert, which he won in four sets.  A month after his Australian triumph Bowrey married the women's player Lesley Turner. The game went open in April that year and at the first Open Wimbledon Bowrey lost in the second round to Andrés Gimeno. Defending his Australian title the following year Bowrey blew a two sets to love lead in the quarters against Ray Ruffels. Bowrey represented Australia in two Davis Cup rounds, the first against the U.S in the World Group Final in December 1968, where he lost to Clark Graebner in five sets and beat Arthur Ashe in four sets. The second in the North & Central America draw in May 1969 versus Mexico, where he won against Joaquin Loyo-Mayo and lost to Rafael Osuna.

Bowrey was also involved in one of the longest matches in tennis history at Wimbledon in 1970 against Patricio Cornejo that consumed nearly four hours and took 84 games. In January 1970 Bowrey turned professional which meant he was no longer eligible to play in the Davis Cup. Later that year Bowrey with partner Marty Riessen won the Rogers Cup (formerly Canadian Open) in two sets against Fred Stolle and Cliff Drysdale 6–3, 6–2. He also won the Rome ATP World Tour Masters – Doubles that year with Owen Davidson.

Bowrey married fellow tennis professional Lesley Turner in 1968 and went into semi-retirement in 1972 at the age of just 28, becoming a coach. After their playing careers were over, Bowrey and his wife Lesley became the lead match-play commentators at Wimbledon on the All-England Club's radio station and Internet Web site "Radio Wimbledon."

Grand Slam finals

Singles (1 title)

Doubles (3 runners-up)

Grand Slam tournament performance timeline

Singles

References

External links
 
 
 
 

1943 births
Living people
Australian Championships (tennis) champions
Australian male tennis players
Tennis players from Sydney
Tennis people from Victoria (Australia)
Grand Slam (tennis) champions in men's singles
Grand Slam (tennis) champions in boys' doubles
Australian Championships (tennis) junior champions
20th-century Australian people